Sullivan Township is located in Livingston County, Illinois. As of the 2010 census, its population was 724 and it contained 354 housing units. Sullivan Township formed from Saunemin Township in 1863.

Geography

The township contains the village of Cullom and the former communities of Griswold, Sullivan Center and Saxony.

Demographics

References

External links
US Census
City-data.com
Illinois State Archives

Townships in Livingston County, Illinois
Populated places established in 1863
Townships in Illinois
1863 establishments in Illinois